Gareth Sager (born 10 August 1960 in Edinburgh, Scotland) is a British guitarist, keyboardist, musician, composer and songwriter, and is a founding member of The Pop Group, Rip Rig + Panic (with Neneh Cherry), Float Up CP and Head. 

In his early years, Sager became acquainted with the works of Erik Satie, Frédéric Chopin and Claude Debussy, an influential starting point revisited and expanded upon with 2017's solo piano album 88 Tuned Dreams. 

After The Pop Group first disbanded in 1980, Sager formed the conceptual collective Rip Rig + Panic, headed by a young Neneh Cherry. They released three albums and a run of singles. During these years Sager also played saxophone on "A-Train", a track featured on The Flying Lizards' Fourth Wall. In 1985 Rip Rig + Panic (with Neneh Cherry) changed their name to Float Up CP releasing one final album and single before amicably disbanding. 

Soon after, Sager helped initiate Head, transforming his work once again and pursuing a soused, anthemic pop under the influence of The Pogues, Captain Beefheart and the traditional sea shanties and folk tunes of Sager's base for many years, Bristol. 

In a solo capacity, as CC Sager, Pregnant and as Gareth Sager respectively, Sager's work has been championed and comprehensively collated by Glasgow institution and John Peel favourite Creeping Bent. He was also engaged in manifold collaborations with the late Scottish punk poet and 'tragedian' Jock Scot, including regular live performances at Edinburgh Festival Fringe, as well as a record, Caledonian Blues, released by Geoff Barrow's Invada Records.

References

External links
Review of Head's A Snog on the Rocks album

Musicians from Bristol
1960 births
Living people
British rock guitarists
British male guitarists
British rock keyboardists
British songwriters
British post-punk musicians
Musicians from Edinburgh
People educated at George Watson's College
The Pop Group members
Rip Rig + Panic members